RC Cola (short for Royal Crown Cola) is an American brand of cola invented by Claud A. Hatcher in 1905. 

Royal Crown Ginger Ale was the first product of the RC Cola line, and it referred to the original ingredient: ginger. More ingredients were introduced under the RC Cola name including lemon, strawberry, and cane sugar. In the 1950s, Royal Crown company was leading the beverage industry to sell the first canned soft drinks, followed by the first caffeine-free cola. Despite the company's innovation and mass advertising campaign, total revenue was low due to a lack of initiative in distribution.

RC Cola is owned and distributed by Keurig Dr Pepper for the United States and RC Global Beverages Inc. for international markets.

History
In 1901, the Cole-Hampton-Hatcher Grocery Store was established in Columbus, Georgia. In 1903, the Hatcher family took sole ownership and the name was changed to the Hatcher Grocery Store. The grocery store was located at what was 22 West 10th Street. Today's address (after house number changes) is 15 West 10th Street. At the same time, the popularity of bottled soft drinks rose rapidly, and grocery store owners wished to maximize their profit. As a grocery wholesaler, Claud A. Hatcher purchased a large volume of Coca-Cola syrup from the local company salesman, Columbus Roberts. Hatcher felt that the company deserved a special reduced price for the syrup since it purchased such large volumes. Roberts would not budge on the cost, and a bitter conflict between the two erupted. Hatcher told Roberts he would win the battle by never purchasing any more Coca-Cola, and Hatcher determined to develop his own soft drink formula. He started developing products in the basement of the store with a recipe for ginger ale.

Hatcher launched the Union Bottling Works in his family's grocery store. The first product in the Royal Crown line was Royal Crown Ginger Ale in 1905, followed by Royal Crown Strawberry, and Royal Crown Root Beer. The company was renamed Chero-Cola in 1910, and in 1925 renamed Nehi Corporation after its colored and flavored drinks. In 1934, Chero-Cola was reformulated by Rufus Kamm, a chemist, and re-released as Royal Crown Cola.

In the 1950s, Royal Crown Cola and Moon Pies were a popular "working man's lunch" in the American South. In 1954, Royal Crown was the first company to sell soft drinks in a can, and later the first company to sell soft drinks in an aluminum can. In 1958, the company introduced the first diet cola, Diet Rite.

In 1976, the Raffel family sold Arby's to the Royal Crown Cola Company for $18 million.

Caffeine-free cola RC 100 was launched in 1980.

In 1984, RC Cola accounted for approximately 4-5% of soft drink sales in the United States, behind Coke, Pepsi, Dr. Pepper, and 7 Up. In that year, it was purchased by DWG Corporation (later renamed Triarc).

In the mid-1990s, RC released Royal Crown Draft Cola, billed as a "premium" cola using pure cane sugar as a sweetener instead of high fructose corn syrup. Offered only in 12-ounce bottles, sales were disappointing, due largely to the inability of the RC bottling network to get distribution for the product in single-drink channels, and it was discontinued with the exceptions of Australia, New Zealand, and France. It was later available only in New Zealand, parts of Australia, Thailand, and Tajikistan. The company also released Cherry RC, a cherry-flavored version of the RC soft drink to compete with Cherry Coke and Wild Cherry Pepsi.

In September 2000, Royal Crown was acquired by Cadbury Schweppes (which owned Dr Pepper) through its acquisition of Triarc's beverages business (which also included Snapple). Cadbury Schweppes' US-based beverage business (including RC) was spun off as "Dr Pepper Snapple Group (DPSG)" in 2008. DPSG merged with Keurig Green Mountain in 2018 as Keurig Dr Pepper, the current owners of the RC Cola brand.

In 2001, all non-US RC-branded businesses were sold to Cott Beverages of Canada, and became operated as Royal Crown Cola International. In 2021, Cott sold RCI International to Refresco for US$50 million. Simultaneously, Refresco sold RCI International to RC Global Beverages Inc.

In September 2022, Philippine-based Macay Holdings announced it will acquire 100% of RC Global Beverages Inc. The transaction is subject to the finalization of a share purchase agreement and other closing conditions.

Brand portfolio

Advertising campaigns

The RC Cola brand has been marketed through many campaigns. In the 1930s, Alex Osborn, with BBDO, made an ad campaign, including the slogan "The season's best."

The 1940s saw a magazine advertising campaign with actress Lizabeth Scott as the face, next to the slogan "RC tastes best, says Lizabeth Scott".

In 1966, Royal Crown Cola collaborated with Jim Henson on an ad campaign for Royal Crown Cola which featured two birds called Sour Bird (performed by Jim Henson) and Nutty Bird (performed by Henson and assisted by Frank Oz) to promote the drinks. Nutty Bird would promote Royal Crown Cola by touting its benefits. The puppet for Nutty Bird was designed by Jim Henson and built by Don Sahlin. Sour Bird appeared on The Ed Sullivan Show with the Rock and Roll Monster.

Nancy Sinatra was featured in two Royal Crown Cola commercials in her one-hour TV special, Movin' With Nancy, which featured various singers and David Winters choreography in December 1967. She sang, "It's a mad, mad, mad Cola...RC the one with the mad, mad taste!...RC!" The company was the official sponsor of New York Mets on and off at times from the team's inception in 1962 until the early 1990s. A television commercial in the New York area featured Tom Seaver, New York Mets pitcher, and his wife, Nancy, dancing on top of a dugout at Shea Stadium and singing the tune from the Sinatra campaign. 

RC sponsored two Porsche 917/10 Can-Am race cars during the 1972-73 season. In the mid-1970s, Royal Crown ran the "Me & My RC" advertisements. Others featured people in scenic outdoor locations. The jingle, sung by Louise Mandrell, went, "Me and my RC / Me and my RC /'Cause what's good enough / For other folks / Ain't good enough for me." 

RC was introduced to Israel in 1995 with the slogan "RC: Just like in America!" During the Cola Wars of the 1980s, RC used the 'Decide for yourself' campaign and would remind people 'There's more to your life than Coke and Pepsi."

In the Philippines, RC Cola released advertisements with artists popular in the country. In 2009, these had Maja Salvador and Kim Bum as celebrity endorsers. The Philippine marketing of the brand also painted the front of sari-sari stores with slogans like "RC ng (insert municipality/city)" (RC of my [town/city]). In 2019, the advertisements tapped Joshua Garcia to be the year's celebrity endorser and launched the "RC ng Bayan" campaign. In 2020, RC Cola had a campaign Basta, which featured a boy confronting his mother if he is adopted due to glasses embedded on his back. This campaign led to numerous awards such as a bronze award for Film at the Cannes Lion 2021, a bronze award at the 2021 Asia Pacific Effie Awards for the Youth Marketing category, a silver award at the 2022 Asia Pacific Effie Awards for the Beverages, Non-Alcohol category and the Short Video Marketing category, and a bronze award for Film at the 2022 Clio Awards.

Andretti Autosport driver Marco Andretti had RC Cola as his primary sponsor during the 2012 and 2013 IndyCar Series.

References

External links

 Official RC Cola International site
 Keurig Dr. Pepper website

1905 establishments in Georgia (U.S. state)
American cola brands
Caffeinated soft drinks
Keurig Dr Pepper brands
Products introduced in 1905